Ex-Champ is a 1939 American drama film, directed by Phil Rosen. It stars Victor McLaglen, Tom Brown, and Nan Grey, and was released on June 16, 1939.

Cast list
 Victor McLaglen as Tom Grey
 Tom Brown as Bob Hill
 Nan Grey as Joan Grey
 William Frawley as Mushy Harrington
 Constance Moore as Doris Courtney
 Donald Briggs as Jeffrey Grey
 Samuel S. Hinds as Commissioner Nash
 Thurston Hall as Mr. Courtney
 Marc Lawrence as Bill Crosley
 Charles Halton as Trilby

References

External links 
 
 
 

Universal Pictures films
Films directed by Phil Rosen
1939 drama films
1939 films
American drama films
American black-and-white films
1930s American films
1930s English-language films